Jason Christopher Lee (born September 7, 1968, in San Antonio, Texas) is an American voice actor and video editor who co-founded the dubbing studio Gaijin Productions with his wife Amanda Winn-Lee. He uses the stage name Jaxon Lee per Screen Actors Guild rules because there is another actor named Jason Lee, the star of NBC's My Name Is Earl.

Anime roles
 .hack//Legend of the Twilight – Pretty Grunty
 All Purpose Cultural Cat Girl Nuku Nuku – Delinquent on Roof, Guy in Classroom, Newscaster, Scientific Rep; Worker
 Blue Seed – Mamoru Kusanagi
 Bubblegum Crisis: Tokyo 2040 – Daniel, Sewer Crew 4
 Burn Up W – Yuji Naruo
 Burn Up Excess – Yuji Naruo
 Dead Leaves – Retro
 Devil Hunter Yohko – Hideki Kando
 Ellcia – Doner
 Fire Emblem – Dohga
 Golden Boy – Narration, Yakuza A
 Gunsmith Cats – Lead Thug
 MÄR – Ash, Blue-Haired Bully (Ep. 1), Master Moku, Monkey 1 (Ep. 2)
 Neon Genesis Evangelion – Shigeru Aoba
 Neon Genesis Evangelion: Death & Rebirth – Shigeru Aoba
 Plastic Little – Computer Tech
 R.O.D.: Read or Die – Drake Anderson
 Rebuild of Evangelion – Shigeru Aoba (Amazon Prime Video dub)
 Sorcerer Hunters – Kou
 The End of Evangelion – Shigeru Aoba

Production credits
 Blue Seed – Script
 Burn Up Excess – Script
 Dead Leaves – Producer
 Evangelion: Death and Rebirth – Voice Director, Script, Producer
 The End of Evangelion – Voice Director, Script, Producer
 R.O.D.: Read or Die – Producer

References

External links

Jaxon Lee at CrystalAcids Anime Voice Actor Database

1968 births
20th-century American male actors
21st-century American businesspeople
21st-century American male actors
American male voice actors
Living people
People from San Antonio
American voice directors
Television video editors